George Wright Needham (28 April 1894 - 30 March 1967) was an English professional footballer who played for clubs including Derby County, Northampton Town, and Gillingham, for whom he made over 120 Football League appearances.

References

1894 births
1967 deaths
English footballers
Derby County F.C. players
Gillingham F.C. players
Northampton Town F.C. players
Worksop Town F.C. players
Association football midfielders